The Jedediah Higgins House is a historic house on Higgins Hollow Road in North Truro, Massachusetts.  It is one of the least altered 19th-century Cape style houses in the Cape Cod National Seashore, and an excellent early example of that style.  It is a -story post-and-beam house, whose front facade typifies the Cape style: a central doorway flanked by windows on either side.  Its interior floor plan is also typical, with two rooms on the south side and one large one to the north, with a central chimney.  Interior finishes have also been preserved, including wood flooring, paneling, and wainscoting.

The house was listed on the National Register of Historic Places in 1984.

See also
National Register of Historic Places listings in Barnstable County, Massachusetts
National Register of Historic Places listings in Cape Cod National Seashore

References

National Register of Historic Places in Cape Cod National Seashore
Houses in Barnstable County, Massachusetts
Truro, Massachusetts
Houses on the National Register of Historic Places in Barnstable County, Massachusetts